Marie Seyrat is a French record producer and singer-songwriter for the indie pop band Freedom Fry.

Career
Seyrat began her career in fashion working for Gucci and styling the likes of Sharon Stone. She met record producer Bruce Driscoll while employed as his stylist for a music video. During this time, Seyrat performed some music she'd been working on. Driscoll, whom she would later marry, was impressed by her voice and her unique, French-accented vocals. They began writing songs together and formed the group Freedom Fry soon after.

References

External links 

 

Living people
French women singers
Musicians from Paris
Year of birth missing (living people)